A cut bank, also known as a river cliff or river-cut cliff, is the outside bank of a curve or meander in a water channel (stream), which is continually undergoing erosion. Cut banks are found in abundance along mature or meandering streams, they are located on the outside of a stream bend, known as a meander, opposite the slip-off slope on the inside of the bend. They are shaped much like a small cliff, and are formed by the erosion of soil as the stream collides with the river bank. As opposed to a point bar, which is an area of deposition, a cut bank is an area of erosion.

Typically, cut banks are steep and may be nearly vertical. Often, particularly during periods of high rainfall and higher-than average water levels, trees and poorly placed buildings can fall into the stream due to mass wasting events. Given enough time, the combination of erosion along cut banks and deposition along point bars can lead to the formation of an oxbow lake.

Not only are cut banks steep and unstable, they are also the area of a stream where the water is flowing the fastest and often deeper. In geology, this is known as an area of high-energy.

Material eroded here is deposited downstream in point bars.

See also

References

 Tarbuck, E. J. and F. K. Lutgens. Earth, 7th Edition. Prentice Hall: Upper Saddle River, New Jersey, 2002. pp. 279, 286.

Geomorphology
Fluvial landforms
Limnology